Andreas Kontogouris (1700s - 1824) was a Greek revolutionary leader during the Greek War of Independence.

He was born in the island of Cefalonia at the time it was in Venetian hands and later moved to Patras, on the present-day mainland of Greece, in 1786.

Kontogouris was counsellor to France, Spain, United States and other governments.  He accumulated a great fortune and participated during the revolution. He also ran the Cefalonian Body, which he equipped at his own expense.  When the Turks invaded Patras, he was chased away and returned to Kefalonia.  Before he left, he set light to his warehouses, most of which were full, so that his goods would not fall into the hands of the Turks.

References
Peloponnesian Revolutionary Leaders of 1821, Nikitaras Remembered (ποννήσιοι αγωνιστές του 1821, Νικηταρά απομνημονεύματα = Peloponissoi agonistes tou 1821, Nikitara apomnimonevmata), Fotakou, Vergina publishers, Athens 1996
''This article is translated and is based from the article at the Greek Wikipedia (el:Main Page)

18th-century births
1824 deaths
People from Cephalonia
Greek military leaders of the Greek War of Independence